The 2014–15 FA Women's Premier League Plate was the inaugural season of the Premier League Plate, which was introduced as a secondary League Cup competition of the FA Women's Premier League (FA WPL).

Preston North End became the first ever winners of the Plate, beating Huddersfield Town 3–0 in the final at Guiseley's Nethermoor Park to win their first major trophy.

The teams that took part in the WPL plate were decided after the first qualifying round of the WPL Cup, known as the Determining Round. The winners of Determining Round matches continued in the WPL Cup, while the losers moved into the WPL Plate.

Background
Due to a restructuring of elite-level women's football in England in 2014, the WPL had doubled in size from three divisions to six. With this in mind the league opted to introduce a new cup competition to run alongside their existing League Cup competition, the Premier League Cup, to cater for the increased number of teams.

Seventy teams were entered into the Determining Round of the FA WPL Cup, with the 35 match losers being eligible for the Plate, but two teams (Keynsham Town development and Norwich City) withdrew from the competition, meaning only 33 teams took part.

Results
All results shown here were published by The Football Association. Games are listed firstly in chronological order, and then by alphabetical order of the home team. The division each team played in is shown in Brackets after their name: (N)=Northern Division; (S)=Southern Division; (N1)=Northern Division One; (M1)=Midlands Division One; (SE1)=South East Division One; (SW1)=South West Division One.

Preliminary round

All other teams were given a bye to the first round of the competition.

First round

Shanklin were given a bye to the second round.

Second round

Quarter-finals

Semi-finals

Huddersfield town reached the final of a major cup competition for the first time in their history thanks to a 4–1 victory over Isle of Wight side Shanklin, witnessed by a small crowd of just 40 people at the West Yorkshire club's Storthes Hall ground. It was their second cup semi-final win in quick succession, having recently also reached the final of the Sheffield & Hallamshire Women's Challenge Cup. Emily Heckler scored twice for Huddersfield, and Kate Mallin and Debbie Hastings each scored once. Rowan Treagus scored Shanklin's consolation goal. Midfielder Alarna Fuller was named Huddersfield's Player of the Match.

Preston North End earned their place as Huddersfield's opposition in the final through a 1–0 victory over West Ham United. The only goal of the game was scored by Preston's Chelsea Flanagan. West Ham, who were missing a number of regular first team players, rarely threatened the Preston goal, and eventually conceded the winning goal ten minutes from time.

Final

Huddersfield were beaten 3–0 in the final by Preston North End, who were winners of a major trophy for the first time in their history. The final was played at Guiseley's Nethermoor Park ground as part of a double-header with the FA Women's Premier League Reserves Cup, which was played in the morning before the Plate final. Spectators were allowed into the ground to watch both games for free.

References

FA Women's National League Plate
2014–15 in English women's football